Coming of the White Man is a bronze sculpture by American artist Hermon Atkins MacNeil, installed in Washington Park, Portland, Oregon in the United States. The statue was gifted to the City of Portland in 1904 by former mayor David P. Thompson and installed the following year. It depicts two Native American men, including Chief Multnomah, looking towards the Columbia River upon the arrival of Lewis and Clark.

Description

Coming of the White Man is a bronze sculpture designed by Hermon Atkins MacNeil (1866–1947), an American artist most known for depicting indigenous peoples of the Americas and Western pioneers. The statue is installed in Portland's Washington Park, along Southwest Washington Way. It depicts Chief Multnomah and another Native American man looking towards the Columbia River upon the arrival of Lewis and Clark. One man is shown holding branches in his lifted right arm, pointed in the direction of the approaching explorers; the other figure folds his arms in front. 

According to the Regional Arts & Culture Council, which administers the work, the sculpture measures  ×  ×  and is mounted to a stone base that measures  ×  × . The irregular stone base has an inscription of the work's title. The pedestal displays the text "Presented to the City of Portland by the Family of David P. Thompson" as shown in the image.

History
The statue was donated to the City of Portland in 1904 by former mayor David P. Thompson. It was installed the following year, ahead of the Lewis and Clark Centennial Exposition.

See also

 1904 in art
 Lewis and Clark (sculpture), Salem, Oregon

References

External links
 

1904 establishments in Oregon
1904 sculptures
Bronze sculptures in Oregon
Outdoor sculptures in Portland, Oregon
Sculptures of men in Oregon
Sculptures of Native Americans in Oregon
Statues in Portland, Oregon
Washington Park (Portland, Oregon)